Premium Air Shuttle was an airline based in Nigeria.

Fleet 

As of August 2006 the Premium Air Shuttle fleet includes:

3 Yakovlev Yak-40

References 

Defunct airlines of Nigeria